Church of St. Stephen ( / Crkva Svetog Stefana) was a Serbian Orthodox church located in Donje Nerodimlje, in the municipality of Uroševac, Kosovo and Metohija. It belonged to the Diocese of Raška and Prizren of the Serbian Orthodox Church and it was destroyed by Albanian extremists in 1999.

Location 
The church dedicated to St. Stephen, dating from the 14th century, was located in the valley of the river Nerodimka, at the cemetery in Nerodimë e Poshtme, five kilometers west of Ferizaj. The church was rebuilt in 1996.
After the arrival of the US KFOR forces in 1999, the church was damaged, burned and destroyed by Albanians.

Notes

References

External links 
 The list of destroyed and desecrated churches in Kosovo and Metohija June-October 1999 (Списак уништених и оскрнављених цркава на Косову и Метохији јун-октобар 1999)

Serbian Orthodox church buildings in Kosovo
Medieval Serbian sites in Kosovo
Destroyed churches in Kosovo
Persecution of Serbs
Former Serbian Orthodox churches
14th-century Serbian Orthodox church buildings
1400 establishments in Europe
Religious organizations established in the 1400s
Ferizaj
Cultural heritage of Kosovo
Cultural Monuments of Exceptional Importance (Serbia)